The  LNWR 317 class, (also known as Saddle Tank Shunter, Dock Tank or Bissel Tank) consisted of a class of 20 square saddle-tanked steam locomotives built by the London and North Western Railway at their Crewe Works between 1896 and 1901.  They had a very short coupled wheelbase, with a trailing Bissel truck to carry weight.

History
They were built in three batches of 1, 9 and 10; their first running number was chosen at random from the numbers left vacant by locomotives that had been transferred to the duplicate list. This fate was almost immediately suffered by the 317 class – after only one or two months in service.

All passed to the London, Midland and Scottish Railway in 1923, who initially allocated them the numbers 6400–6419 in the passenger tank sequence. Only five (6402/03/07/14/18) had been renumbered before the numbers were changed to 7850–7869 in 1927, thus moving them into the goods and shunting tanks. The LMS changed their power classification from 1P to 0F at the same time. 

Two, 7862 and 7865, survived to enter British Railways service in 1948; 7865 was withdrawn in November 1953, and 7862 three years later. None were preserved.

Fleet

References

External links 
 http://www.lnwrs.org.uk/GoodsLocos/Loco08.php

Dock Tank
0-4-2ST locomotives
Railway locomotives introduced in 1896
Scrapped locomotives
Standard gauge steam locomotives of Great Britain